The Fifth is the fifth studio album by German band Bad Boys Blue. The record was released on October 29, 1989 by Coconut Records.

Background
The album includes two singles: "Lady in Black" and "A Train to Nowhere". Track "No regrets" was originally sung by Edith Piaf as "Non, je ne regrette rien" written by Charles Dumont.

All the songs were performed by John McInerney. Trevor Taylor left the band and was replaced by Trevor Bannister (born August 5, 1965 in Grimsby, England), whose function in the group was mainly to perform Trevor Taylor's hits in live shows. It is during Bannister's tenure with the band that Bad Boys Blue began widely touring in Eastern Europe—thus gaining much popularity there. The album was certified gold in Finland in 1990.

Sometimes the name of the album is spelled as The 5th.

Track listing
"Lady in Black" – 3:46   
"Someone to Love" – 3:05   
"A Train to Nowhere" – 3:53   
"I'm Not a Fool" – 3:49   
"No Regrets" – 4:45   
"Where Are You Now" – 3:38   
"Fly Away" – 3:44   
"Love Me or Leave Me" – 3:54   
"Show Me the Way" – 3:54   
"A Train to Nowhere (Train Mix)" – 3:59

Personnel
Bad Boys Blue
John McInerney – lead vocal (all tracks)
Andrew Thomas – rap parts (9)
Trevor Bannister

Additional personnel
All tracks written by T. Hendrik/K.van Haaren except 5 written by Charles Dumont/Irving Taylor & 3, 10 written by T. Hendrik/T. Hendrik, K.van Haaren 
Arranged by Hazel Stoner & Tony Hendrik, except 7, 9 arranged by Hans Steingen 
Additional arrangements and keyboards by Uwe Haselsteiner 
Produced by Tony Hendrik & Karin Hartmann

Tracks 1 to 4 and 6 to 10 are written by T. Hendrik and K. van Haaren. 
Track 5 is written by Charles Dumont and Irving Taylor.

Sales and certifications

References

External links
Album lyrics
ALBUM - The Fifth

1989 albums
Bad Boys Blue albums